Anomie is a lack of social norms that can result in fragmentation of an individual's ideal social identity.

Anomie may also refer to:

Music
Anomie Belle (born 1980), American musician and artivist
Anomie (Fairmont album), second studio album by indie rock band Fairmont
Anomie (Stephen Simmonds album), fourth album by Swedish singer Stephen Simmonds
Anomie (Tim Sköld album), second studio album by Swedish rock artist Tim Sköld

Other uses
 Institutional Anomie Theory, a derivation of strain theory

See also
Anomia (disambiguation)